Lane County Fair is a fair that is held in the middle of the summer every year, at Eugene, Oregon, and it features cuisine, entertainment, and music. Excellent family entertainment, cuisine, and artwork can be found at the Lane County Fair. A Lane County Agricultural Society was established in 1858, and on October 9, it hosted its inaugural show, which was still not regarded as fair. In 1860, a state agricultural association was established, and it was planned to host a state fair. From October 3 to October 4, 1860, a state fair was conducted close to Oregon City. On October 9 and 10, 1861, there was another fair. Finally, the inaugural "Lane County Fair" was held for three days on September 25, 1884. Excellent family entertainment is available at the Lane County Fair, including performances, rides, games, and fun. Examine the arts and crafts, agricultural, and animal exhibits in the exhibition hall. Enjoy the fair classics like cotton candy, elephant ears, BBQ, and ice cream from your favorite food vendors. There will be a big Ferris wheel at the fair that will allow you to see Eugene and the fairgrounds from above. horses, cattle, sheep, goats, rabbits, and poultry will be presented and evaluated for both adult and juvenile competition.

History 
Before 1858 at Eugene, Oregon. Due to its favorable terrain and fertile soil, Eugene has been described as a natural center for agriculture. But farmers appear to make little money. this is due to the lack of suitable roadways for transporting goods between Eugene and the marketplaces in Portland. The only option to move such products was to use a steamship that sailed up the Willamette, but the cost of shipping was high. In response to these circumstances, farmers begin to get together and formed farmer's clubs, which are essentially communities where farmers share knowledge and methods to advance the American agricultural system. They exchange growing techniques and shipping advice.

Later in 1858 a Lane County Agricultural Society was formed and held the first exhibition on 9 October but still not considered fair. In 1859 Lane County Agricultural Society had another meeting on 7 April. The meeting was big enough that it was considered the advisability of holding a fair. This led to another meeting in the same year 7 December with the representative of other county societies. In another meeting on 22 February 1860, a state agricultural society was formed and decided to hold a state fair in 1860. Thus the first state fair was held from 3 October to 4 October 1860 near Oregon City. Another fair was on the 9th and 10 October 1861. After that Apparently, there were no fairs held. Finally, On 25 September 1884, The first official "Lane County Fair" was held for three days with the officers and members of Lane County Agricultural Society sponsorship. It was a success and the fairs were continuously held until 1910 with the help of granges the best exhibits were sent to Portland for advertisement and became known across the country. It stated that 1910 is the end of the pioneer fairs and the beginning of our present-day modern fairs.

Events 
The Lane County Fair has excellent family entertainment, including shows, carnival rides, games, and fun. The fair will have a variety of carnival rides, including a sizable Ferris Wheel that will give you a bird's-eye perspective of the fairgrounds and Eugene. Each ride requires nine to ten tickets, and single ride tickets cost 50 cents. Enjoy your favorite food vendors serving up traditional fair delicacies like cotton candy, elephant ears, BBQ, and a ton of ice cream. Explore the exhibition hall, arts and crafts, and agricultural and animal displays. Beer & Wine, Floral, Food Preservation, Textiles, Photography, and more are among the inventive displays this year. For both adult and youth competition, horses, cattle, sheep, goats, rabbits, and poultry will be displayed and judged.

Entertainments & Exhibitions

Animal Exhibits 
Animal Exhibits is about the animal and 4-H exhibits can be found at the south side of the fair indoors, along with the judgment of livestock to see a horse show.

All-Alaskan Racing Pigs 
All-Alaskan Racing Pigs is the pig racing track that is one of the Lane County Fair's most famous attractions.

There is a team of pigs that are trained to run and jump over obstacles.

Tractor Pull 
Tractor Pull is the tractor pedal pulling that kids can ride a mini tractor and ground-shaking at the fair.

Washboard Willy’s Jamboree 
Children's entertainer Washboard Willy is a distinctive and engaging character. Washboard Willy has transformed into a Pied Piper of Rhythm for kids of all ages thanks to his benevolent spirit. Their collection of rhythmic toys inspires creative musical expression. He leads a procession and stroll through the fair, and performs on the stage in the kids' area. "In Washboard Willy's wake, smiles emerge."

Professor Smart, Family Fun stage 
According to the fair's description, Professor Smart, a skilled juggler and comic, "brings science to life with narrative and cool demonstrations."

Toddler Zone 
Toddler Zone is a family-run soft play rental business that brings a safe, entertaining environment. It engages the little children in imaginative and inquisitive activities.

Balloonacy 
Balloonacy is a very talented balloon carver who can create over 100 different animals with balloons. They perform throughout the event in family and community fun arenas.

Balloon Ride 
Younger children can go on the balloon ride. Cars revolve when hung from balloons.

Dragon Wagon 
For smaller children, there is a multi-car dragon-shaped attraction called the Dragon Wagon. It follows an oval-shaped trajectory on a wavy surface.

Vertigo and Kamikaze 
There are two rides for adults and older children. Chairs began to spin and rise in vertigo. Unseen below the frame, Kamikaze pulls a sitting car in a wide arc.

The Elephant Ride 
For older children and perhaps parents, there is an elephant ride. Elephants rotate around it, each with an adjustable arm.

Power Jump 
On the Power Jump, children can flip and jump quite high. Each child jumps on a trampoline while hung from elastic cords. The addition of the elastic cords to the leap allows for extremely high jumps and the freedom to flip.

Foods and beverages 

Featured foods include elephant ears (crunchy, cinnamon and sugar coated circles of fried dough, commonly referred to as fry bread) fried ravioli, grilled cheese with blackberries, pizza, beer, wine, barbecue, and ice cream.

Main Stage Concert

2020 & 2021 
There was no fair held in these two years due to COVID-19 pandemic.

References

External links 
 

August events
Fairgrounds in the United States
Tourist attractions in Lane County, Oregon
Festivals in Eugene, Oregon
Annual fairs
Agriculture in Oregon
Fairs in Oregon
Annual events in Eugene, Oregon